Stephanie Price may refer to:

 Stephanie Price (athlete) (born 1972), Australian hurdler
 Stephanie Price (rower) (born 1953), British rower